Beltinge  is a low cliff-top suburb of Herne Bay in Kent, England. It forms the easternmost part of the urban area of Herne Bay and is just west of the small settlement of Reculver, which had an important Roman Fort and a channel which served to provide safer passage around what was the 'Isle of Thanet' until the early Middle Ages.

Geography
Beltinge, Bishopstone and Hillborough are the three geographically contiguous eastern localities of Herne Bay, each low density and residential.

Beltinge Cliff describes a large central portion of the gently sloping cliff range.  These are the first cliffs east of London. A pedestrian promenade north of this has the Saxon Shore Way, part of the round-Kent coastal long-distance walk.  Three nearby flights of steps connect the promenade with the rest of the east of Herne Bay or Beltinge.

Immediately south of these three small areas is Herne Bay's rural fifth, forming a buffer zone which serves to separate the eastern development from the A299 and the Chatham Main Line.

See also
Saxon Shore Way

External links

Herne Bay, Kent